Shattered Haven is a survival puzzle adventure video game created and published by Arcen Games, initially developed under the name Alden Ridge. The plot is set in a Lovecraftian post-apocalypse, where the player must navigate branching storylines to protect a small family from zombies (called "grays" in the game), limited resources, and impassible terrain. Each level is a fully contained puzzle, and the player must use only the resources contained in that level to complete the objective.

References

External links
Official website
Official soundtrack at Bandcamp

2013 video games
Adventure games
Linux games
MacOS games
Post-apocalyptic video games
Puzzle video games
Survival video games
Video games developed in the United States
Windows games
Video games about zombies